Ceriosporopsis is a genus of fungi in the family Halosphaeriaceae. The genus contains seven species.

References

External links
Ceriosporopsis at Index Fungorum

Sordariomycetes genera
Microascales